Baldonnel (population ~142) is a town in the Peace River District of British Columbia, Canada, near Fort St. John. The community contains a K-6 school and used to contain a post office.

Name
The community gives the name to the gas bearing Baldonnel Formation.

Climate

References

Unincorporated settlements in British Columbia
Peace River Country
Populated places in the Peace River Regional District